Veeramachaneni Rajendra Prasad was an Indian film producer, director, and screenwriter known for his works predominantly in Telugu cinema along with a few Hindi and Tamil films. He won one National Film Award for Antastulu (1965) and two Filmfare Awards for films, Antastulu and Aastiparulu (1966). He is the father of noted actor Jagapathi Babu.

Death
VB Rajendra Prasad died on 12 January 2015 at Isha Hospital following a serious respiratory ailment. Doctors informed that it was a natural death.

Awards
National Film Awards
 Best Feature Film in Telugu - Antastulu (1965).

Filmfare Awards
 Best Film - Antastulu (1965)
 Best Film – Telugu - Aastiparulu (1966)

Nandi Awards
Third Best Feature Film - Bronze - Asthiparulu (1966)
 Raghupathi Venkaiah Award (2003) - Lifetime achievement
Other honors
 K. V. Reddy memorial Award (2000)

Filmography

See also
 Raghupathi Venkaiah Award

References

External links
 

Film producers from Andhra Pradesh
Film directors from Andhra Pradesh
Telugu film directors
Telugu film producers
Tamil film directors
Hindi film producers
Hindi-language film directors
1932 births
2015 deaths
People from Krishna district
20th-century Indian film directors
Filmfare Awards South winners
Nandi Award winners
Tamil film producers
20th-century Indian dramatists and playwrights
Screenwriters from Andhra Pradesh
20th-century Indian businesspeople